James Luther Mays (July 14, 1921 – October 29, 2015) was an American Old Testament scholar. He was Cyrus McCormick Professor of Hebrew and the Old Testament Emeritus at Union Presbyterian Seminary, Virginia. He served as president of the Society of Biblical Literature in 1986.

Mays wrote commentaries on Psalms, Hosea, Amos, and Micah. He was formerly editor of Interpretation.

In 1986, a Festschrift was published in his honor, called The Hermeneutical Quest: Essays in Honor of James Luther Mays on His Sixty-fifth Birthday. It included contributions from Elizabeth Achtemeier, James Barr, Brevard Childs, Patrick D. Miller, James A. Sanders, and Claus Westermann.

Works

Books

Festschriften

Notes

References

2015 deaths
1921 births
American biblical scholars
Old Testament scholars
Bible commentators
Union Presbyterian Seminary faculty
Academic journal editors